Line Records is a Brazilian gospel record label and it belongs to Universal Church of the Kingdom of God. Was founded in Rio de Janeiro, in 1992 with the intent to tend the gospel music demand. In February 2012, it was announced that Line Records was planning to wind down and pay off its debts over the next five years.

Artists

Adilson Silva
Adriana Ferreira
Adriana Marques
Banda Audiolife
Banda Catedral
Bruna Melo
Comunidade Bereana
David Fantazzini
Fernanda Lara
Francisco de Assis
George Hilton
Gilson Campos
Gisele Nascimento
Isis Regina
J.Neto
Jamily
Janaina Brandão
Juliana Evely
Kades Singers
Kim
Leo Portela
Leonor
Ma-Lu
Mara Maravilha
Marcelo Brayner
Marcelo Domingues
Marcelo Nascimento
Márcio Pinheiro
Melissa
Michelle Nascimento
Ministério Vem, Ó Deus
Moysés
Paulo César Baruk
Pérolas
Regis Danese
Renato Suhett
Robinson Monteiro
Rogério Luis
Salgadinho
Soraya Moraes
Sula Miranda
Gustavo Sibilio Borges

See also
Rede Aleluia
Universal Church of the Kingdom of God

References

External links
 ABPD - Record Produções e Gravações. Ltda 
 Official website - Artists 

Brazilian record labels
Universal Church of the Kingdom of God
Companies based in Rio de Janeiro (city)